In graph theory, eigenvector centrality (also called eigencentrality or prestige score) is a measure of the influence of a node in a network. Relative scores are assigned to all nodes in the network based on the concept that connections to high-scoring nodes contribute more to the score of the node in question than equal connections to low-scoring nodes. A high eigenvector score means that a node is connected to many nodes who themselves have high scores. 

Google's PageRank and the Katz centrality are variants of the eigenvector centrality.

Using the adjacency matrix to find eigenvector centrality 
For a given graph  with  vertices let  be the adjacency matrix, i.e.  if vertex  is linked to vertex , and  otherwise. The relative centrality score, of vertex  can be defined as:

 

With a small rearrangement this can be rewritten in vector notation as the eigenvector equation

 

In general, there will be many different eigenvalues  for which a non-zero eigenvector solution exists. However, the additional requirement that all the entries in the eigenvector be non-negative implies (by the Perron–Frobenius theorem) that only the greatest eigenvalue results in the desired centrality measure. The  component of the related eigenvector then gives the relative centrality score of the vertex  in the network. The eigenvector is only defined up to a common factor, so only the ratios of the centralities of the vertices are well defined. To define an absolute score, one must normalise the eigenvector e.g. such that the sum over all vertices is 1 or the total number of vertices n. Power iteration is one of many eigenvalue algorithms that may be used to find this dominant eigenvector. Furthermore, this can be generalized so that the entries in A can be real numbers representing connection strengths, as in a stochastic matrix.

Normalized eigenvector centrality scoring 
Google's PageRank is based on the normalized eigenvector centrality, or normalized prestige, combined with a random jump assumption. The PageRank of a node  has recursive dependence on the PageRank of other nodes that point to it. The normalized adjacency matrix  is defined as:where  is the out-degree of node , or in vector form:

 ,

The normalized eigenvector prestige score is defined as:  

 
or in vector form,

Applications 
Eigenvector centrality is a measure of the influence a node has on a network. If a node is pointed to by many nodes (which also have high eigenvector centrality) then that node will have high eigenvector centrality.

The earliest use of eigenvector centrality is by Edmund Landau in an 1895 paper on scoring chess tournaments.

More recently, researchers across many fields have analyzed applications, manifestations, and extensions of eigenvector centrality in a variety of domains:
 Eigenvector centrality is the unique measure satisfying certain natural axioms for a ranking system.
 In neuroscience, the eigenvector centrality of a neuron in a model neural network has been found to correlate with its relative firing rate.
 Eigenvector centrality and related concepts have been used to model opinion influence in sociology and economics, as in the DeGroot learning model.
 The definition of eigenvector centrality has been extended to multiplex or multilayer networks.
 In a study using data from the Philippines, researchers showed how political candidates' families had disproportionately high eigenvector centrality in local intermarriage networks.
 Eigenvector centrality has been extensively applied to study economic outcomes, including cooperation in social networks. In economic public goods problems, a person's eigenvector centrality can be interpreted as how much that person's preferences influence an efficient social outcome.

See also 
 Centrality

References 

Graph theory
Network analysis